Maulana Abdul Majeed Ludhianvi (born; 5 June 1934 – 1 February 2015) (Urdu: مولانا عبدالمجید لدھیانوی) was a Pakistani Islamic scholar and writer who served as 7th Emir of Aalmi Majlis Tahaffuz Khatm-e-Nubuwwat and a senior member of the Executive Committee of Wifaq ul Madaris Al-Arabia, Pakistan

Early life and education
Ludhianvi was born to Hafiz Muhammad Yusuf in 1934 in an Aryan family in Salempur Jagraon Tehsil, Ludhiana district. His father was a pious man and a middle-class landowner and farmer. He got his early education from Government High School at Salempur. During the eighth grade, it was decided the partition of India. He moved to Pakistan with his parents and settled in Shorkot and passed the middle school examination here. After that in 1949 he entered Jamia Darul Uloom Rabbania in Toba Tek Singh, to get religious education. After two years, he enrolled in Madrasa Ashraf Al-Rasheed in Faisalabad. Meanwhile, he married into a family living in Kamalia. Then he entered Jamia Qasim-ul-Uloom Multan and graduated from Dars-i Nizami in 1956. He studied Bukhari and Tirmidhi from Maulana Abdul Khaliq, a student of Mahmud Hasan Deobandi, and Sahih Muslim from Mufti Mahmood. He also had the permission of Hadith from Muhammad Zakariyya al-Kandhlawi, Muhammad Idris Kandhlawi and Muhammad Yousuf Banuri.

Career
After the demise of Khawaja Khan Muhammad in 2010, he was elected Amir of the Aalmi Majlis Tahaffuz Khatm-e-Nubuwwat. He also served as 4th president of Iqra Rozatul Atfal Trust.

Literary works
 Tibyan ul Furqan (6. Vol)
 Khutbaat e Hakeem ul Asar (12. Vol)

Death
He died on 1 February 2015 of a heart attack at a seminar of the Wifaq ul Madaris Al-Arabia at Multan. His funeral prayer was led by Saleemullah Khan. Nawaz Sharif (then Prime Minister), Shahbaz Sharif (then Chief Minister) and Maulana Fazlur Rehman have offered condolences on his death.

References

Deobandis
1934 births
2015 deaths
Hanafis
Pakistani Islamic religious leaders
Pakistani Sunni Muslim scholars of Islam
Muslim missionaries
Emirs of Aalmi Majlis Tahaffuz Khatm-e-Nubuwwat
Aalmi Majlis Tahaffuz Khatm-e-Nubuwwat people
Scholars from Ludhiana
Jamia Qasim Ul Uloom alumni